Stephanie Morton,  (born 28 November 1990) is a retired Australian track cyclist. She has won national and international cycling titles, and was Felicity Johnson's tandem pilot at the 2012 Summer Paralympics in London, where she won a gold medal.

Personal
Stephanie Morton was born in Adelaide on 28 November 1990. , she works for the "Bee Safe on Bikes" education program for junior primary school students.

Cycling
Morton is a member of South Coast Cycling Club and is part of Team Jayco AIS. She started cycling competitively at the age of 15. Competing at the 2011 National Keirin Final, she finished second behind Anna Meares. She made her Australian national team debut at the 2011 Para-cycling Track World Championships with Felicity Johnson. She has said forming a friendship and real partnership was key for the pair's success.

In 2012, she participated in the UCI Para-cycling Track World Championships in Los Angeles as the pilot for Johnson, and finished first in the B tandem 1 km time trial and the B Tandem sprint. At the 2012 London Paralympics, they won a gold medal in the Women's 1 km Time Trial B event, and were subsequently awarded the Medal of the Order of Australia in the 2014 Australia Day Honours "for service to sport as a Gold Medallist at the London 2012 Paralympic Games."

In November 2012, Morton came first in the Keirin and second in the sprint at the Oceania Track Championships. In the third round of the 2012–13 UCI Track Cycling World Cup Classics in Aguascalientes, Mexico, she came first in the team sprint with Kaarle McCulloch and 6th in the keirin, while at the 2013 UCI Track Cycling World Championships in Minsk, Belarus, she came fourth in the team sprint (with McCulloch) and sixth in the individual sprint.

At the 2013 Australian National Track Championships in Sydney, she came first in the keirin, individual sprint, and team sprint (with Rikki Belder). In February 2014, she scored an upset win at the Australian track cycling championships by beating Anna Meares in the Keiren for the first time. Meares tweeted a photo of a cap that she had signed for Morton five years before, on which she had written: "Steph, maybe one day you'll beat me".

At the 2014 Commonwealth Games in Glasgow, Morton competed in the track sprint and 500 m time trial, while Johnson had a new partner, Holly Takos. Morton rode a personal best time of 34.079 in the 500 m time trial at the Sir Chris Hoy Velodrome, but won silver after Anna Meares posted a faster time. However, she defeated Meares in the track sprint, winning two heats to none in the best-of-three final to take the gold medal.

Major results

2011
1st Tandem B – 1000m Time Trial, UCI Para-cycling Track World Championships (Pilot for Felicity Johnson)
1st Tandem B – 1000m Time Trial, New Zealand Oceania Para-Cycling Regional Cup (Pilot for Felicity Johnson)
2012
1st Tandem B – 1000m Time Trial, Paralympic Games (Pilot for Felicity Johnson)
UCI Para-cycling Track World Championships
1st Tandem B – 1000m Time Trial (Pilot for Felicity Johnson)
1st Tandem B – Sprint (Pilot for Felicity Johnson)
2013
Melbourne Cup on Wheels
1st Keirin
2nd Sprint
2014
Oceania Track Championships
1st  Keirin
1st  Sprint
1st  Team Sprint (with Kaarle McCulloch)
Commonwealth Games
1st  Sprint
2nd  500m Time Trial
Adelaide Cycling Grand Prix
1st Sprint
2nd Keirin
1st Sprint, Super Drome Cup
2nd Sprint, South Australian Track Classic
2015
Oceania Track Championships
1st  Keirin
1st  Team Sprint
2nd  Sprint
3rd Sprint, Super Drome Cup
2016
Austral
1st Keirin
1st Sprint
Oceania Track Championships
2nd  Keirin
3rd  Sprint
2nd Sprint, ITS Melbourne DISC Grand Prix
2nd Sprint, ITS Melbourne Grand Prix
2017
Oceania Track Championships
1st  Team Sprint (with Kaarle McCulloch)
1st  Sprint
1st  Keirin
Australian Track Championships
1st  Sprint
1st  Team Sprint (with Rikki Belder)
1st  Keirin
ITS Melbourne – DISC Grand Prix
1st Keirin
1st Sprint
ITS Melbourne – Hisense Grand Prix
1st Keirin
1st Sprint
Austral
1st Keirin
2nd Sprint
UCI World Track Championships
2nd  Sprint
2nd  Team Sprint (with Kaarle McCulloch)
2nd  Sprint, Round 1, (Pruszków) Track Cycling World Cup
2018
Commonwealth Games
1st  Team Sprint (with Kaarle McCulloch)
1st  Sprint
1st  Keirin
2nd  500m Time Trial

References

External links

 
 

1990 births
Living people
Australian female cyclists
Australian track cyclists
Olympic cyclists of Australia
Paralympic cyclists of Australia
Paralympic gold medalists for Australia
Paralympic medalists in cycling
Paralympic sighted guides
Cyclists at the 2012 Summer Paralympics
Cyclists at the 2016 Summer Olympics
Medalists at the 2012 Summer Paralympics
Commonwealth Games gold medallists for Australia
Commonwealth Games silver medallists for Australia
Commonwealth Games medallists in cycling
Cyclists at the 2014 Commonwealth Games
Cyclists at the 2018 Commonwealth Games
Cyclists from Adelaide
Recipients of the Medal of the Order of Australia
South Australian Sports Institute alumni
Sportswomen from South Australia
UCI Track Cycling World Champions (women)
20th-century Australian women
21st-century Australian women
Medallists at the 2014 Commonwealth Games
Medallists at the 2018 Commonwealth Games